Kolbor (also Romanized as Golbār, Golpar, and Gulbar) is a village in Japelaq-e Gharbi Rural District, Japelaq District, Azna County, Lorestan Province, Iran. At the 2006 census, its population was 314, in 72 families.

References 

Towns and villages in Azna County